York Rafael (born 17 March 1999) is a professional footballer who plays for Superettan club Gefle IF, primarily as a left midfielder. Born in Sweden, he represents the Rwanda national team.

Club career

York Rafael started his football career with Gävle side Brynäs IF in 2011. He joined Sandvikens IF's youth academy two years later and made his senior debut with them as a 15-year-old in Division 2. In 2015 Rafael went on trials with European clubs Watford and Lazio, as well with Swedish IFK Göteborg the previous year, without signing any contracts.

After having been linked with a move to AIK, Rafael instead joined Allsvenskan club Gefle IF on  loan in August 2016. He made his Gefle debut in Svenska Cupen, playing 90 minutes against Söderhamns FF on August 24. It was followed up with his professional debut in Allsvenskan three days later against Djurgårdens IF, in which he came on as a substitute in the final minutes.

On 11 December 2017, he joined IFK Värnamo in Superettan, Sweden's second tier. During the 2018 season, York returned to his old club Sandvikens IF on loan. On 11 December 2018, Kalmar FF announced, that they had signed Rafael on a deal until the end of 2021.

International career
He won his first youth international cup for Sweden U17 on 4 August 2015, in Sweden's 3–0 win against Iceland. He played six games in total for U17, for which he is still eligible to play for, until he was called up to Sweden's U19 squad in September 2016. He has scored one goal in three games so far.

Due to his dual citizenship with Rwanda, he was invited to play for Rwanda national football team in 2015. He debuted with Rwanda in a 1–0 2022 FIFA World Cup qualification loss to Uganda on 7 October 2021.

Personal life
Rafael was raised in Gävle, Sweden, to an Angolan father and Rwandese mother. He is a practicing Christian.

He cited Arjen Robben as his idol.

Career statistics

Club

References

External links
  (archive)
 
 

1999 births
Living people
Rwandan footballers
Rwanda international footballers
Swedish footballers
Rwandan people of Angolan descent
Sportspeople of Angolan descent
Swedish people of Rwandan descent
Swedish people of Angolan descent
Swedish sportspeople of African descent
Allsvenskan players
Superettan players
Gefle IF players
IFK Värnamo players
Sandvikens IF players
VfL Bochum players
Kalmar FF players
AFC Eskilstuna players
Association football defenders
Swedish expatriate footballers
Swedish expatriates in Germany
Expatriate footballers in Germany
People from Gävle
Sportspeople from Gävleborg County